Hrólfr Gautreksson was a legendary Geatish king who appears in Hrólfs saga Gautrekssonar and probably in Hyndluljóð.

Hrólfs saga Gautrekssonar tells that he was the son of king Gautrek and when his father died, his elder brother Ketill became king. Hrólfr would court and finally win the Swedish king Erik's daughter Þornbjörg, who was a violent and proud ruler. He later succeeded his brother as king. 

There is also an isolated stanza in Hyndluljóð where Hrólfr the Old appears. The names Þorir the Iron-Shield and Grímr shows that the lines probably refer to Þorir and Grímr Þorkelsson who appear with Hrólfr in Hrólfs saga Gautrekssonar.

Translations: Hrolf Gautreksson, a Viking romance. Translated by Hermann Pálsson, Paul Geoffrey Edwards. University of Toronto Press, 1972. 148 pages.

Primary sources
Hrólfs saga Gautrekssonar
Hrólfs saga Gautrekssonar
Hrólfs saga Gautrekssonar Ed. Guðni Jónsson and Bjarni Vilhjálmsson
Hrólfs saga Gautrekssonar
Hrólfs saga Gautrekssonar
Hyndluljóð

Kings of the Geats